Fukushima disaster may refer to:
 2011 Tōhoku earthquake and tsunami, which caused extensive damage to the eastern coast of Fukushima Prefecture
 Fukushima nuclear disaster, in which the Fukushima Daiichi Nuclear Power Plant was heavily damaged by the 2011 Tōhoku earthquake and tsunami
 Fukushima incident (1882), political tumult in Fukushima Prefecture